Felix Oehme (born 1981) is a German yachtsman.

Sportive successes 

End of 2006, Oehme sailed with a five-man crew over the Atlantic and received the second prize of the Stiftung Hochseesegeln (Foundation for High Seas Sailing) for this performance. In September 2006 and 2008 he successfully represented Germany at the World University Match race. Furthermore, he ranked among the top five in several international races for class 49 boats, including the national German championship.

On November 16, 2008 Oehme and his co-skipper Boris Herrmann forming the Beluga Offshore Sailing Team won the Portimão Global Ocean Race, a five leg regatta around the world for class 40 boats. This makes them the first German professional team on a German yacht to win a leg of an international trans-ocean race and the whole race itself.

References 
 Article at Manager Magazin "Man liegt immer auf der Lauer" 15. November 2008
 Article at Spiegel Online Deutsche Segler mit historischem Erfolg 16. November 2008
 Article at Spiegel Online Herrmann und Oehme gewinnen Portimão Global Race

External links 
Website of Beluga Offshore Sailing Team
Website of Portimao Global Ocean Race (English)
Website of the sponsor Beluga Shipping

1981 births
German male sailors (sport)
Living people